Per Nilsson is a Swedish author. He worked as a music teacher until the summer of 1999, after which he became a full-time author. He has also written the screenplay Hannah with H, based on his early novel Another way to be young. Between 1997 and 2010, he was a Member the Swedish Children's Book College.

Screenplay
 1992 - Första Kärleken (Based on the novel by)
 2003 - Hannah With H

Bibliography 

 1986 - Between waking and sleep (Bonnier)
 1988 - Important things (Name)
 1990 - Backwards Life (Name)
 1992 - The girl who left school, image: Ingela Almgren (Name)
 1993 - Loves Me Loves Me Not (Raben & Sjogren)
 1993 - Yes, let him smile...Huh? (Raben & Sjogren)
 1993 - At thirteen, image: Eva Lindstrom (Name)
 1994 - Raven's Song (Raben & Sjogren)
 1995 - If the seventh night (Name)
 1996 - Anarkai (Raben & Sjogren)
 1998 - You, You & You (Raben & Sjogren)
 1998 - The girl I love is called Milena: a little story about a boy who tries to get a girl to see him, images of Pija Lindenbaum (Name)
 1999 - Not like everyone else: a little story about a boy who wants to know if he is ordinary or normal; images of Pija Lindenbaum, 1999 (characters)
 2000 - Another way to be young (Name)
 2001 - Little Life small death (Name)
 2001 - Forever Milena: a little story about a boy who knows how long love lasts, images of Pija Lindenbaum (Name)
 2002 - Seventeen (Raben & Sjogren)
 2002 - Never again Milena: a little story about a boy who got tired of this with love, pictures of Pija Lindenbaum (Name)
 2003 - Ask & Embla (with Daniel Ahlgren) (Raben & Sjogren)
 2004 - Solprinsen (Raben & Sjogren)
 2004 - Half the stick (with Gunna Grähs) (Name)
 2005 -Twins''' 
 2006 - Svenne: a (o) the possible story (Raben & Sjogren)
 2007 - The Return of hearts' joy (Raben & Sjogren)
 2009 - Absolute Per Nilsson (Raben & Sjogren)
 2010 - This tree (with Catherine Kieri) (Raben & Sjogren)
 2014 - Otopia (Raben & Sjogren)

 Awards and honors 

 1994 - August-nominated of Raven's song 1994 - Raben & Sjogren's contest "Best Love Story" for Valentine's Delight 1997 - Deutscher Jugendliteraturpreis for Joy Of Heart 1997 - Nils Holgersson Plaque for Anarkai 1998 - ABF's Literature
 1998 - August-nominated of You & You & You 1999 - Astrid Lindgren Prize
 1999 - Dutch prize The Silver Kiss for Joy Of Heart 2000 - August-nominated of Another way to be young 2002 - August-nominated of Seventeen 2003 - Expressen Heffaklump for Ask and Embla 2006 - August Prize in Svenne 2006 - Los Angeles Times Book Prize in You & You & You''

References

External links 
 
 Raben & Sjogren, Nilsson's Publisher (swedish)

'

Swedish children's writers
Swedish-language writers
1954 births
Living people
Writers from Malmö
August Prize winners